Senator DeLuca may refer to:

Anthony J. DeLuca (fl. 1990s–2010s), Delaware State Senate
Louis DeLuca (born 1933), Connecticut State Senate